Andrew David Scott (born 30 June 1949) is a Welsh musician and songwriter. He is best known for being the lead guitarist and a backing vocalist in the band Sweet. Following bassist Steve Priest's death in June 2020, Scott is the last surviving member of the band's classic lineup.

Career

Early career
Scott started out playing bass guitar. His first gig was at St Peters Hall in Wrexham with The Rasjaks in November 1963 and then with other bands in Wales such as Guitars Incorporated and 3Ds.

He then progressed to guitar and played with other bands including The Saints, The ForeWinds, and The Missing Links. In 1966 he joined The Silverstone Set (later shortened to The Silverstones), who won the TV show Opportunity Knocks five weeks running, and appeared in the all-winners show for Christmas 1966, losing to Freddie Starr. One of their further highlights was to support Jimi Hendrix in Manchester in January 1967.

When The Silverstones split, Scott went on to form The Elastic Band, who recorded an album called Expansions of Life. Lead singer Ted Yeadon left to join Love Affair, however, before the album's release and the band folded. During this time they also recorded the album Pop Sounds, under the name The Cool.

Scott then played in the backing band for The Scaffold, which also included Mike McGear on bass and saxophone. He went on to join Mayfield's Mule, who recorded three singles, "Drinking My Moonshine", "I See a River" and "We Go Rollin'". An album was also released in Uruguay called Mayfields Mule with the song titles translated on the sleeve into Spanish.

Auditioning for Sweet
In the late summer of 1970, Scott replaced Mick Stewart in The Sweet after an audition in front of Brian Connolly, Steve Priest and Mick Tucker, as well as group managers Nicky Chinn and Mike Chapman. He was one of the last guitarists to audition. According to Steve Priest's autobiography "Are You Ready Steve?", Scott turned up looking pretty untidy, with very long hair and scruffy clothes. He plugged his guitar in and immediately the amplifier to feedback. He eventually performed his piece and the members of the band thought he should join The Sweet.

Solo career
Scott's first single release in 1975 was a reworked version of the Desolation Boulevard track "Lady Starlight" backed by "Where D'Ya Go?". Both songs, recorded during the Give Us A Wink sessions, were written and produced by Scott and Mick Tucker and featured Scott playing all instruments except the drums (Tucker). Scott made a promotional video for the track and also appeared on Mike Mansfield's British TV Show "Supersonic".

Scott released his second solo single, "Gotta See Jane", in 1983 under the name Ladders.  It was a cover of the R. Dean Taylor Motown hit and was produced by himself and Louis Austin, who had worked with Sweet as their engineer on past ventures.  The B-side "Krugerrands", co-written with Chris Bradford,
 

was subsequently released as the follow-up single (as Andy Scott this time), but like its predecessor failed to chart, except in Australia, where it peaked at number 89 and South Africa where it was a top 10 hit. In 1984, Scott released two more solo singles, "Let Her Dance" and "Invisible". A compilation of all his solo projects, including demos, was released by Repertoire Records in 1993, under the title 30 Years.

Paddy Goes to Holyhead and record production
He produced a couple of demos for Weapon, which was then fronted by Danny Hynes who went on to form Paddy Goes to Holyhead and Scott played with them now and again. Scott then produced, played on and appeared in the video for their single "Green Green Grass of Home" and then joined the band on a regular basis until reforming Sweet.

Scott produced the Suzi Quatro album, Back to the Drive, released in February 2006.

Andy Scott's Sweet

In 1985 Scott and Tucker re-formed Sweet with new members Paul Day (ex-Iron Maiden) on lead vocals, Phil Lanzon (ex-Grand Prix now with Uriah Heep) on keyboards, and Mal McNulty (ex-Weapon) on bass. This band became "Andy Scott's Sweet" following Tucker's departure in 1991.

Other work
In July 2010, Scott appeared in UK television adverts for the insurance company VanCompare.com. Three adverts were in circulation featuring "Fox on the Run", "Love Is Like Oxygen", and "Action".

Scott was a main organiser of the first charity Rock Against Cancer concert in All Cannings, Wiltshire, in May 2012, which was headlined by Brian May, The Boomtown Rats, and Midge Ure. Concerts are still ongoing, in which Scott still plays an active role.

Since the death of Steve Priest in June 2020, Andy is the last surviving member of the Sweet.

Personal life
Scott lives in a converted barn at All Cannings, in the Vale of Pewsey, Wiltshire. His wife Maddy left him in 2004 after his absence on a long tour of Australia.

In September 2009 Scott was diagnosed with prostate cancer; following treatment, he was in remission.

Discography

With Sweet

As Andy Scott

Albums
 30 Years (1993; Repertoire Records) (compilation of solo singles and demos)

Singles
 "Lady Starlight" / "Where D'Ya Go" (1975; RCA)
 "Where D'Ya Go" / "Lady Starlight" (1975; RCA)
 "Krugerrands" / "Face" (1984; Statik)
 "Let Her Dance" / "Suck It And See" (1984; Statik)
 "Invisible" / "Never Too Young" (1984; Statik)

12" singles
"Gotta See Jane" / "Gotta See Jane" (Radio Mix) (3:10) / "Krugerrands" (4:00)
"Krugerrands" (Club Mix) (4:04) / "Face" (4:48) / "Krugerrands" (Single Edit) (3:40) / "Krugermental" (4:08)
"Let Her Dance" (8:06) / "Let Her Dance" (Instrumental) (4:24) / "Suck It and See" (4:19)
"Invisible" (7" Version) (3:54) / "Invisible" (Instrumental) (5:53) / "Invisible" (5:20) / "Never Too Young" (3:08)

With Ladders

Singles
 "Gotta See Jane" / "Krugerrands" (1983; Statik/Virgin)

With Andy Scott's Sweet
Starting at the year of 2000 only as "Sweet" again

Singles
 "X-Ray Specs" (1991; SPV)
 "Stand Up" (1992; SPV)
 "Am I Ever Gonna See Your Face Again" (1992; SPV) (1970's Australian chart hit, written by Brewster-Neeson-Brewster and recorded by band The Angels)
 "Do It All Over Again" (2002; Delicious Records)
 "Join Together" (2011; digital release) (a cover of The Who's 1972 chart single, written by Pete Townshend)
 "Let It Snow" (2011; digital release) (US # 1 for Vaughan Monroe in 1946; recorded by Bing Crosby, Frank Sinatra, Dean Martin et al., written by Sammy Cahn and Jule Styne)

Albums
Studio
 "A" (1992; SPV)
 The Answer (1995; SPV) (re-released different version of 'A' with extra tracks)
 Hannover Sessions (1996; Pseudonym) (4-CD set containing "A" recording sessions, "Alive And Giggin'", rarities with bonus video clips and "The Answer")
 Dangerous Game (1997; Chinebridge) (re-released version of 'The Answer')
 Chronology (2002; Delicious) (studio album with re-recordings of Sweet material)
 Sweetlife (2002; Delicious) (studio album of new material)
 New York Connection (2012) (studio album with cover songs)
 The Hits (2012) (studio album with re-recordings of Sweet material and "Let It Snow" as hidden bonus track (included in the track "Peppermint Twist"); digital download and cd version from the official web site)

Live
 Live at the Marquee (1989; SPV/Maze) (double album which includes four new studio recordings; released as a recording by "Sweet"- as it also featured original member Mick Tucker)
 Alive and Giggin'! (1995; Pseudonym)
 Glitz, Blitz & Hitz (1996; CNR) (limited edition version with bonus tracks also released)
 Sweet Fanny Adams Revisited (2012) (digital download, cd version from the official web site and full release in March 2013)
 Desolation Boulevard Revisited (2012) (digital download and full release in March 2013; this is the same album as Sweet Fanny Adams Revisited, only with a different cover)

References

External links

 Andy Scott's personal website
 The Sweet web – Andy Scott's Sweet
 Andy Scott's Sweet website
 Sweet CD’s and eBooks

1949 births
Living people
Welsh rock guitarists
Lead guitarists
People from Wrexham
The Sweet members
Glam rock musicians